

Bowers Mountains is a group of north–south trending mountains in Antarctica, about 145 km (90 mi) long and 56 km (35 mi) wide, bounded by the coast on the north and by the Rennick, Canham, Black and Lillie glaciers in other quadrants. The seaward end was first sighted in February 1911 from the Terra Nova, under Lt. Harry L.L. Pennell, RN, and was subsequently named "Bowers Hills" in honour of Henry Robertson Bowers who perished with Captain Robert Falcon Scott on their return from the South Pole in 1912. The mountain range is one of the most extensive topographical features within Victoria Land.

The feature was photographed from U.S. Navy aircraft in 1946-47 and 1960–62, and was surveyed and mapped by the United States Geological Survey (USGS) in 1962–63. The name was amended to Bowers Mountains upon USGS mapping which showed the group to be a major one with peaks rising to nearly 2,600 metres. The major topographical feature lies situated within the Pennell Coast region of Victoria Land, Antarctica.

Named by New Zealand Antarctic Place-Names Committee (NZ-APC) in 1983 after Chris Adams, New Zealand geologist who worked in northern Victoria Land, 1981–82. The ridge is situated on the Pennell Coast, a portion of Antarctica lying between Cape Williams and Cape Adare.

Features
Geographical features include:

Explorers Range

Lanterman Range

Molar Massif

Posey Range

Other features

 Adams Ridge
 Astapenko Glacier
 Barber Glacier
 Black Glacier
 Carryer Glacier
 Centropleura Spur
 Champness Glacier
 Copperstain Ridge
 Curphey Peaks
 Dow Peak
 Edlin Névé
 Flensing Icefall
 Frolov Ridge
 Gambone Peak
 Gannutz Glacier
 Gateway Hills
 Griffith Ridge
 Helix Pass
 Ian Peak
 Irwin Glacier
 Lillie Glacier
 Markinsenis Peak
 McCann Glacier
 McKenzie Nunatak
 McLin Glacier
 Montigny Glacier
 Mount Ashworth
 Mount Belolikov
 Mount Bradshaw
 Mount Bruce
 Mount Cantello
 Mount Dergach
 Mount Freed
 Mount Gow
 Mount Jamroga
 Mount Janus
 Mount Keith
 Mount Nagata
 Mount Overlook
 Mount Radspinner
 Mount Shearer
 Mount Soza
 Mount Verhage
 Mount Wodzicki
 Platypus Ridge
 Rosenau Head
 Sledgers Icefall
 Stanwix Peak
 Stuhlinger Ice Piedmont
 Van Loon Glacier

Further reading
 Gunter Faure, Teresa M. Mensing, The Transantarctic Mountains: Rocks, Ice, Meteorites and Water, P 116-119
 Edmund Stump, The Ross Orogen of the Transantarctic Mountains, PP 48, 61, 71-72

References

Mountain ranges of Victoria Land
Pennell Coast